Fraternitas Estica is an all-male academic corporation at the University of Tartu, Estonia. It was founded in 1907.

History
1900. In August vil! dr. Aleksander Paldrok makes a proposal at Estonian Students' Society's general assembly to propose the Estonian Students' Society for becoming a corporation. This idea did not get the necessary support

1904. Twelve members of the Estonian Students' Society request to establish a separate corporation

1906. A plea for creating a new corporation is presented to the rector of Tartu University

9 May 1907 (26 April according to Julian calendar). Fraternitas Estica appears first time in colours to the public. This is officially considered the establishing date.

1912. Eleven active members are expelled, who then established corporation Ugala.

1918. Fraternitas Estica members volunteer in corpore to fight in the Estonian War of Independence.

1932. A plot of land with a house is acquired at Aia street 54, in Tartu (nowadays Vanemuise 54).

1988. Three students form the faculty of journalism, Vallo Nuust, Margus Sanglepp and Jaan Murumets, decide to reestablish korp! Fraternitas Estica.
 
March 1989. Tartu University confirms the founding charter.

1996. The Tartu branch of the Eesti Televisioon (Estonian Television) returns the historic convent house after long negotiations.

2007. The Tallinn Chapter is reestablished.

Objectives and ideological grounds
 To consolidate the members into a single fraternal family through a spiritual bond for life that never perishes due to personal difficulties or other circumstances
 To deepen mutual fraternal interaction, mutual support and sincere helpfulness in all situations
 To educate members into persons with high moral and ethical values, who prefer honesty and straightforwardness to anything else
 To stimulate members' intellectual activities by creating an organisational unity for satisfying those needs
 To assist and aid in creating preconditions for obtaining higher education for Estonians in general and especially in pursuit of higher education
 To deepen and preserve national mentality thus preferring intelligence to power, freedom to peace and content to form
 To raise members to be citizens who love, respect and want to progress the Estonian land and nation, Estonian culture and language
 To progress and preserve the Estonian like and minded type of intellectual, the Estonian way of life, family and home
 To work with other organisations, both academic and non-academic, to achieve overlapping objectives

Notable members
Friedrich Akel 
Martin Jervan
Mihkel Lüdig
Konstantin Päts
Alfons Rebane

External links

1900s establishments in Estonia
Student organizations established in 1907
University of Tartu
1907 establishments in the Russian Empire